Polish Uplanders (also known as Western Pogorzans and Eastern Pogorzans), are a distinctive subethnic group of Poles that mostly live in the Central Beskidian Range of the Subcarpathian highlands. The Polish Uplanders inhabited the central and the southern half of the Beskids in Poland, including the Ciężkowickie, Strzyżowskie and Dynowskie Plateau as well as Doły Jasielsko-Sanockie, from the White River (Biała) in the west to the San River in the east.

They represent the major population groups inhabiting the Subcarpathian Voivodeship. These are mainly Polish people with a part numbers of German and Rusyn people .

Polish Uplanders are neighbours with: Lachy sądeckie to the west; Krakowiacy and Rzeszowiacy to the north, and; Dolinians and Lemkos (both Rusyn subgroups) to the south.

With regard to cultural differences Uplanders are divided into two parts: western (the area of Gorlice, Jasło and Strzyżów), southern Sanok, and eastern (Brzozów). The border between those two groups is in Krosno. The differences between western and eastern groups were especially seen in architecture and clothes.

Traditional occupations of the Polish Uplanders included agriculture, oil mining and the military; today these are joined by the service and petroleum industries, and agrotourism. The Pogórzan dialect is considered by Polish scholars to be part of the Lesser Polish dialect cluster.

Eastern Pogorzan landscape

History
In 1854 in the village Bóbrka near Krosno, the first oil field in the world began production.

 Sanok Land

Foods

See also

 Gorals
 Muzeum Budownictwa Ludowego w Sanoku
 Rusyns
 The Petroleum Trail International Tourist Trail

References

Bibliography
Michael Burleigh. Germany Turns Eastwards. Astudy of Ostforschung in the Third Reich. Cambridge. 1988.
Ernst Schwarz. Von den "Walddeutschen" in Galizien, "Schlesien" Jh. V. Z. III. S. 147–156.
Wojciech Blajer. Bemerkungen zum Stand der Forschungen uber die Enklawen der mittelalterlichen deutschen Besiedlung zwischen Wisłoka und San. [in:] Późne średniowiecze w Karpatach polskich. red. Prof. Jan Gancarski. Krosno. 2007.

External links
Pogorzans (Polish Uplanders)
Pogórzanie
Gisele Hildebrandt, Otto Adamski. Dorfimfersuchungen in dem alten deutsch-ukrainischen Grenzbereich von Landshuf. Kraków. 1943. Urzejowice, (Urzejowice) Markowa (Markowa)

Podkarpackie Voivodeship
Ethnic groups in Poland